Ghana Meteorological Agency (GMet) is a governmental agency under the Ministry of Communication mandated to offer weather and climate services, to analyze scientific research findings and provide guidance on climate change.

It is a certified ISO 9001: 2015 weather forecast institution with its headquarters in Accra.

History 
The agency was established in 2004 by The Ghana Metrological Agency Act, 2004 Act 682 to replace the Ghana Meteorological Service Department, the latter was established in 1937 in the Gold Coast.

Observation of weather patterns started in the 1830s around  Aburi Gardens in the Eastern Region by the Basel Mission. In 1886, the British colonial government setup three climatological stations along the coast of the colony, its operations were entrusted to the Medical departments.

With 14 synoptic stations in 1957, it has increased to 25, with 210 approximate stations. These stations can be located in Navorongo, Accra, Wenchi, Sunyani, Kete-krachi, Yendi, Kumasi, Koforidua, Ho, Abetifi, Akatsi, Takoradi, Saltpond, Big-Ada, Akuse, Sefwi-Bekwai, Axim, Akim-Oda, Abetifi, Tarkwa, Enchi and Akosombo. The agency is financed under  the  National Meteorological Fund.

Departments 
The Agency has the following departments;
 Synoptic Meteorology and Forecasting
 Support Services
 Research and Applied Meteorology
 Engineering
 Basic Network and Data Processing

Meteorological services 
The Ghana Meteorological Agency provides meteorological services to the general public through daily weather forecasts. It also provides specialized services to other agencies and institutions, these include:

 10 day rainfall bulletin to Water Research Institute (WRI)
 Keeps meteorological watch -over the Flight Information Region for the Ghana Civil Aviation Authority                                                                                  
 Rainfall and Evaporation data for management of the hydro-electric dams at Akosombo and Kpong to the Volta River Authority
 Briefing of trainee pilots and pilots of the Ghana Military Aviation
 Maritime weather to the Ghana Navy
 Six hourly maritime weather forecasts to  ships both on high seas and in Port Operations on weather warnings, sea surface temperatures.

Heads of Meteorological Organization 
The current Director-General is Dr. Michael Tanu.

References

External links 

 Ghana Meteorological Agency Website
Ghana Meteorological Facebook Page

Government agencies of Ghana
Environment of Ghana
Governmental meteorological agencies in Africa